Hardwood Ridge is an unincorporated community in Northfield Parish, Sunbury County, New Brunswick, Canada.

It is located eight kilometres north-northeast of Minto.

History

Hardwood Ridge was a farming community in 1866, there was a population of about forty families.  Part of Hardwood Ridge used to be Linton between 1866 and 1932, a community with a population of one-hundred in 1871; Stephen Linton was the first postmaster of Linton.

Notable people

See also
List of communities in New Brunswick

References

Communities in Sunbury County, New Brunswick